Gavin Sheets (born April 23, 1996) is an American professional baseball right fielder and first baseman for the Chicago White Sox of Major League Baseball (MLB). He made his MLB debut in 2021.

Amateur career
Sheets attended Gilman School in Baltimore, Maryland. The Atlanta Braves selected him in the 2014 Major League Baseball draft. He did not sign with the Braves, and instead enrolled at Wake Forest University to play college baseball for the Wake Forest Demon Deacons. In 2016, he played collegiate summer baseball with the Wareham Gatemen of the Cape Cod Baseball League. In 2017, his junior season, Sheets batted .317 with 21 home runs and 84 RBIs in 63 games and was named All-Atlantic Coast Conference. He also played for the Baltimore Redbirds of the Cal Ripken Collegiate Baseball League.

Professional career
The Chicago White Sox selected Sheets in the second round, with the 49th overall selection, of the 2017 Major League Baseball draft. Sheets signed with the White Sox, receiving a $2 million signing bonus. He began his professional career with the Arizona White Sox of the Rookie-level Arizona League. After playing four games in Arizona, the White Sox promoted him to the Kannapolis Intimidators of the Class A South Atlantic League. Sheets posted a combined .279 batting average, four home runs, and 28 RBIs in 56 games between both clubs. 

Sheets spent 2018 with the Winston-Salem Dash of the Class A-Advanced Carolina League, where he slashed .293/.368/.407 with six home runs and 61 RBIs in 119 games. He spent 2019 with the Birmingham Barons of the Class AA Southern League, batting .267/.345/.414 with 16 home runs and 83 RBIs over 126 games. He was selected to play in the Arizona Fall League for the Glendale Desert Dogs following the season. Sheets did not play in a game in 2020 due to the cancellation of the minor league season because of the COVID-19 pandemic, and was not invited to participate at the White Sox' alternate training site.

On November 20, 2020, Sheets was added to the 40-man roster. Sheets began the season with the Charlotte Knights of the new Triple-A East, and in addition to playing first base, he received his first professional games in the outfield. On June 3, 2021, following the placement of regular left fielder Andrew Vaughn on the COVID-19 injured list, Sheets was recalled to the major league team, but was sent back down to Charlotte following Vaughn's return two days later, without appearing in a game. Sheets was promoted to the major leagues for a second time on June 29. 

Sheets made his MLB debut that day as the starting right fielder against the Minnesota Twins. In the game, Sheets recorded his first major league hit — a single to left field — off Kenta Maeda . In that same game, he recorded his first major league RBI, his first extra base hit, and scored his first major league run, off  Maeda. On June 30, he hit his first major league home run off of Matt Shoemaker. On July 19, during the second game of a doubleHeader, Sheets recorded his first career walk-off hit, with a three run home run off  José Berríos to win the game 5-3. Overall in 2021, Sheets appeared in 54 games with a .250 batting average while hitting 11 Home Runs and 34 RBI's. Sheets was added to the postseason roster that same year. Sheets made his postseason debut in game 1 against the Houston Astros, going 0-for-4. In game 4, Sheets hit his first postseason home run, off  Lance McCullers Jr., which would be the only run the White Sox would score in that game as they lost 10–1 and were eliminated.

Personal life
He is the son of former Major League Baseball outfielder Larry Sheets.

References

External links

1996 births
Living people
People from Lutherville, Maryland
Baseball players from Maryland
Major League Baseball first basemen
Major League Baseball right fielders
Chicago White Sox players
Wake Forest Demon Deacons baseball players
Wareham Gatemen players
Arizona League White Sox players
Kannapolis Intimidators players
Winston-Salem Dash players
Birmingham Barons players
Glendale Desert Dogs players
Charlotte Knights players
Gilman School alumni